Guilty, the debut EP by Norwegian band Octavia Sperati (then called only Octavia) was released in 2002.

Track listing
"Nebula"
"Deprivation"
"Guilty, Am I"
"A Dying Sun In The Morning Of Moonlight"
"Solicitude"

Personnel
Silje Wergeland – vocals
Bodil Myklebust – guitar
Gyri S. Losnegaard – guitar
Trine C. Johansen – bass
Tone Midtgaard – keyboard
Hege S. Larsen – drums

2002 EPs
Octavia Sperati albums